Ronald James Dobson, CBE, QFSM, FIFireE is a retired senior British firefighter. He was the Chief Fire Officer of the London Fire Brigade until December 31, 2016.

Career
Dobson joined the London Fire Brigade in 1979 and rose through the ranks to be promoted Assistant Chief Fire Officer in 2000. In 2002, he became the principal officer responsible for delivering the Brigade's day-to-day operations.

On 1 October 2007, he was appointed Commissioner for Fire and Emergency Planning at the London Fire and Emergency Planning Authority, succeeding Sir Ken Knight. He was responsible for the world's third largest fire and rescue service with 112 fire stations and 7000 staff, 6000 of whom are operational firefighters.  Until his promotion to Chief Fire Officer, he was responsible for operational policy and training. The title is generally shortened to commissioner – the most senior officer of the LFEPA, but the role includes all the functions of a Chief Fire Officer or Brigade Manager in a local authority fire and rescue service.

Honours
Dobson was awarded the Queen's Fire Service Medal (QFSM) in the 2005 New Year Honours for "distinguished service". He was appointed Commander of the Order of the British Empire (CBE) in the 2011 New Year Honours. He is a recipient of the Queen Elizabeth II Golden Jubilee Medal, the Queen Elizabeth II Diamond Jubilee Medal and the Fire Brigade Long Service and Good Conduct Medal.

References

See also
London Fire Brigade
Chief Fire Officer
London Fire and Emergency Planning Authority
Chief Fire Officers Association

London Fire Brigade personnel
Commanders of the Order of the British Empire
Living people
Year of birth missing (living people)
Recipients of the Queen's Fire Service Medal